Open wire was an early transmission technology in telecommunication, first used in telegraphy. It consisted of pairs of electric wire strung on a pole line between communities, towns, and cities.

The wire of the transmission line was attached to the cross-arms of each pole with glass insulators. It was originally manufactured from iron or steel, but developments in annealing of copper made it possible to use this metal by the 1890s to reduce electrical resistance substantially. Copper wire was drawn to a diameter of up to 1/6 inch (165 mils).

The glass insulators on the pole cross-arms were spaced at about 12 inches apart. Typically up to five wire pairs were installed on each crossarm, and multiple cross-arms could be installed on each pole.

The practical limit in distance of telephone communication via open-wire transmission was reached when the Bell System long-distance network was extended from New York City to Denver in 1911. Despite heavy-gauge wire, and using loading coils to reduce transmission loss, talking was just barely possible over the line.

See also
General Toll Switching Plan

References

Chapman, A.G. Open-Wire Crosstalk, BSTJ 13(1)19, January 1934
B.C. Griffith, H. Kahl, Type-O Carrier System Objectives BLR 32(6)p209 (June 1954)

Communication circuits
Telecommunications techniques
Telephony equipment
Telephony
Transmission lines